The Sinister Minister may refer to:

 "The Sinister Minister", a song and single by Béla Fleck and the Flecktones from their album, Béla Fleck and the Flecktones
 The Sinister Minister, a nickname of American professional wrestling manager Father James Mitchell
 Sinister Minister (horse), a horse, winner of the 2006 Blue Grass Stakes